The 1,139-metre-high Almberg lies about 20 kilometres northeast of Freyung near the border between Germany and Czechia. Its mountainsides are mainly used for skiing. On its eastern side is Mitterfirmiansreut, a village whose main focus is winter sports with five ski lifts, a chair lift and an extensive Nordic skiing network. The Almberg star party takes place annually there.

In 2010 on the approach to the village of Alpe an artificial lake was built with a storage volume of about 28,000 cubic metres, which is used to feed the ski cannon in the ski centre.

The summit plateau offers an all-round view over the Bavarian Forest National Park including Rachel and Lusen. On clear autumn days when there is a föhn wind, the Northern Limestone Alps are visible from the Totes Gebirge to the Zugspitze.

The surrounding villages of Philippsreut, Hinterfirmiansreut, Mitterfirmiansreut and Vorderfirmiansreut were founded in the 17th century by the Prince Bishops of Lamberg and Firmian. Prior to that the region was uninhabited. The nearest settlement was Mauth (c. 8 kilometres from Mitterfirmiansreut).

One-thousanders of Germany
Mountains of the Bavarian Forest
Freyung-Grafenau
Mountains of Bavaria
Bohemian Forest